"I'm Not That Guy" is the sixth episode in the third season of the television series How I Met Your Mother and fiftieth overall. It originally aired on October 29, 2007.

Plot
Marshall is thrilled when he learns he got the job he's always wanted at the Natural Resources Defense Council. However, Lily urges him to keep his interview with the corporate, polluter-defending law firm Nicholson, Hewitt, & West. Marshall is surprised at how young and understanding his interviewer Jefferson Coatsworth (John Cho) is, and agrees to go to dinner with him. Barney asserts that Coatsworth is trying to seduce Marshall, but Lily still insists that Marshall should still go to the dinner.

While Marshall enjoys his fancy dinner (and is excited by an encounter with Patrick Swayze, one of NH&W's clients), Robin discovers why Lily actually wants Marshall to take the high-paying corporate job: Lily has dozens of credit cards and is very much in debt, owing to always shopping when she is upset about something. This upsets Robin and she asks Lily to confess to Marshall so that he takes the higher paying job.

Although Marshall agrees to take the job, he regrets it the next day (with a little help from Lily, who eventually urges him to work at the NRDC) and goes to tell Coatsworth that he changed his mind. Coatsworth takes him to an amusement park and tells him that they will be his only client, at which point Marshall decides that he will definitely take the job. Marshall even comments that the amusement park was the "least evil place in the world", although Future Ted mentions that the amusement park was later found to be in violation of several safety standards; three people died and an E. coli outbreak was traced back to the park's corndogs.

Barney has discovered a pornographic movie titled Welcome to the Sex Plane featuring a porn star named “Ted Mosby” (Kevin Heffernan). While Ted is at first amused to discover the reason behind strange encounters with his doctor and a magazine interviewer (and also discovering that Wendy the Waitress watches porn), he then becomes uncomfortable and confused upon learning that porn star Ted Mosby is from the same town as Ted: Shaker Heights, Ohio. He and Barney go to an adult video convention to confront "Bizarro Ted". They find out that porn star Ted idolized him as a child and honored him by taking his name. Ted wants porn star Ted to change his name, so he tells him the person who he really idolized was a fictional kid named Lance Hardwood. Porn star Ted responds by instead making a new movie titled Lance Hardwood: Sex Architect (starring Ted Mosby). The guys watch the new movie in Ted's apartment until they find out that it was filmed in the very same apartment with a little help from Barney, who helped to scout the location for the film.

Critical response

Donna Bowman of The A.V. Club rated the episode B+.

Staci Krause of IGN gave the episode 8.1 out of 10.

References

External links

2007 American television episodes
Adult video in fiction
How I Met Your Mother (season 3) episodes